The 2010–11 Syracuse Orange season was their third season. The Orange competed in the College Hockey America conference and were unable to win the NCAA Championship. The Orange were the host club for the 2011 CHA Tournament and appeared in the CHA championship game losing to Mercyhurst by a 5–4 score.

Offseason
August 2: Former NCAA All-American player Sabrina Harbec will join the Orange coaching staff for the 2010–11 season.
September 21: The Orange have been selected to finish second in the College Hockey America (CHA) Preseason Coach's poll.

Recruiting
July 9:Head coach Paul Flanagan announced that 10 new student-athletes will join the program for the 2010–11 season.

Regular season
October 1: By tying Northwestern in the season opener, it marked the first time that the Orange started the season unbeaten. Stefanie Marty had two goals in the game. Northeastern featured her twin sister Julia Marty. It was the first time the sisters had ever played against each other in their NCAA careers.
October 8: With a 4–2 defeat of New Hampshire, the Orange is off to its best start in program history (1–0–1). In the win, senior transfer Ashley Cockell scored her first career goal for the Orange. Freshman goaltender Kallie Billadeau made 26 saves as she played in her first game for the Orange.
October 16: The Orange continue their best start in program history with a 2–2–1 record. The Orange registered a 7–1 win against Connecticut. Syracuse’s seven goals against Connecticut ties for second all-time in Orange history. Twelve different players registered points. Isabel Menard recorded the first hat trick in school history and added an assist. In addition, freshman Sadie St. Germain scored her first career goal and had two assists in the win. The Orange outshot the Huskies 38–19. In faceoffs, they had a 38–17 advantage over them.
Oct 22–23: Isabel Menard had five assists in two games as the Orange swept Union by scores of 3–1 and 5–0, respectively. In the 5–0 triumph, Jenesica Drinkwater registered the first shutout of her career. She turned away 13 shots and extended her record to 2–0–1 on the season.
 Nov. 5: Isabel Menard scored both of Syracuse’s goals as the Orange lost 3–2 versus Clarkson. Menard’s  second goal was scored with 1:23 remaining in regulation. She took the puck the length of the ice, beating every Clarkson defender to net her seventh goal of the season.
November 23 – December 4: Orange freshman Akane Hosoyamada has at least one point in five of the Orange’s last six games dating back to Nov. 23. She had two assists in each game against Wayne State. Her second assist in the second game versus Wayne State.
On November 30, Kallie Billadeau set a Syracuse record with 57 saves in a 4–1 loss against No. 1 Cornell.
November 30 – December 4: Isabel Menard registered two goals and two assists in a span of three games. She had a goal and an assist in both wins against Wayne State to help the Orange start conference play with two wins. As of December 6, Menard’s 16 assists rank 14th nationally and tie for second in the CHA. She now has nine multiple-point scoring games this season, a Syracuse program record.
Dec 3–4: Kallie Billadeau, was instrumental in helping the Syracuse start conference play at a mark of 2–0. In both games, she had 76 saves. In game two against Wayne State, she turned away 19 shots to help SU start CHA play 2–0.
On January 22, Sadie St. Germain scored the only goal in a 3–1 loss to Niagara on Saturday. She now has two goals and four assists, which is tied for 11th in the CHA in freshman scoring.  
February 21: Isabel Menard was one of twenty-five nominees for the Patty Kazmaier Memorial Award. She has been Syracuse's leading scorer since her career began in 2009. In 2010–11, she registered 15 goals and 22 assists, ranking 24th in the nation in points per game. Her 15 goals rank 25thand is tied for 22nd in assists (21). She has recorded a program record 11 multiple-point scoring games this season.

Standings

Schedule

Conference record

Postseason
March 5, 2011: In the CHA championship game, Meghan Agosta scored three goals to top 300 points for her career. The Lakers defeated Syracuse 5–4 and captured its ninth straight College Hockey America title. Despite getting outshot 13–3 in the first period, Syracuse scored two goals on its first two attempts on the power play. Stefanie Marty gave the Orange an early 1–0 lead and Margot Scharfe scored the second goal. In the third period, Mercyhurst had a 5–3 lead when Julie Rising scored the team's fourth power play goal of the game.
Freshman goaltender Kallie Billadeau combined for 59 saves in two games during the CHA Tournament. She earned her first career shutout (1–0) against the Niagara Purple Eagles in the semifinals. In the championship versus Mercyhurst, she turned away 41 shots. Billadeau was named to the all-tournament team for her performances.

Player stats

Skaters

Awards and honors
Kallie Bilodeau, CHA Goaltender of the Week (Week of February 28)
Kallie Bilodeau, CHA All-Tournament team
Ashley Cockell, CHA Player of the Week (Week of February 21)
Isabel Menard, CHA Player of the Week (Week of October 18)
Isabel Menard, CHA Player of the Week (Week of February 28)
Sadie St. Germain, CHA Rookie of the Week (Week of October 18)
Margot Scharfe, CHA Rookie of the Week (Week of February 28)

Postseason
Kallie Billadeau, 2011 CHA All-Rookie team
Akane Hosoyamada, 2011 CHA All-Rookie team
Isabel Menard, 2011 Patty Kazmaier Award Nominee
Isabel Menard, 2011 All-CHA First Team

See also
2008–09 Syracuse Orange women's ice hockey season
2009–10 Syracuse Orange women's ice hockey season

References

S
S
Syracuse Orange
Syracuse Orange
Syracuse Orange